Tede may refer to:

People
 Tede (rapper) (born 1976), Polish rapper

Places
 Tede, Atisbo, Nigeria

Other
 Total effective dose equivalent, radiation dosimetry quantity